Semily is a town in the Liberec Region of the Czech Republic. It has about 8,100 inhabitants.

Administrative parts

Town parts of Bítouchov and Podmoklice and the village of Spálov are administrative parts of Semily.

Geography
It lies on the confluence of rivers Jizera and its left tributary Oleška. There is a nature reserve called Jizera Valley. 

Most of the municipal territory lies in the Giant Mountains Foothills. In the southwest, it extends into the Ještěd–Kozákov Ridge.

History
The first written mention of Semily is from 1352, when existence of a church is mentioned. In the middle of the 19th century, the settlement transformed into a wealthy town when the industrialization arrived and the development of rail transport occurred. Semily also profited from an advantageous location near the Jizera River.

Demographics

Sights

The main landmark is the neo-Romanesque Church of Saints Peter and Paul. It was built in 1908, after the old church was torn down.

The town has two museums: the Museum and Regional Gallery and the Museum of Raspers.

Notable people
František Ladislav Rieger (1818–1903), politician
Antal Stašek (1843–1931), writer and lawyer, lived and worked here in 1877–1913
Bohumil Kučera (1874–1921), physicist
Ivan Olbracht (1882–1952), writer
Magdalena Jetelová (born 1946), artist

Twin towns – sister cities

Semily is twinned with:
 Kolochava, Ukraine
 Schauenburg, Germany

References

External links

Cities and towns in the Czech Republic
Populated places in Semily District